Cheondeungsan  (천등산 / 天燈山) is a mountain of Gyeongsangbuk-do, eastern South Korea. It has an elevation of 574 metres.

See also
List of mountains of Korea

References

Andong
Mountains of North Gyeongsang Province
Mountains of South Korea